Islington North is a constituency in Greater London represented in the House of Commons of the UK Parliament since 1983 by Jeremy Corbyn, who was Leader of the Labour Party and Leader of the Opposition from 2015 to 2020.

The constituency was established for the 1885 general election.

Constituency profile
The seat includes the densely populated and multicultural suburbs of Finsbury Park, Canonbury, Highbury and the northern part of Holloway. Despite high incomes and house prices, there is also more  deprivation than the UK average.

Political history
The constituency has elected a Labour Party candidate at each election since a by-election in 1937. Since then the smallest majority was 10.4% of the vote, in a by-election in 1969, on a very low turnout.

The MP since 1983, Jeremy Corbyn, had his smallest majority (15.3%) in 1983 and his largest (60.5%) in 2017. In the ten elections during Corbyn began representing the constituency, the Conservatives have finished in second place five times while the Liberal Democrats have also been runners up on five occasions. The 2015 result made the seat the 26th safest of Labour's 232 seats by percentage of majority.

In the 2016 referendum to leave the European Union, the constituency voted remain by 78.4%. This was the fifth highest support for remain for a constituency.

Boundaries

1885–1918 

The seat was created by the Redistribution of Seats Act 1885, as one of four divisions of the new parliamentary borough of Islington. The constituency was defined in the legislation as consisting of the single ward of Upper Holloway of the parish of Islington. The ward was one of eight used in the election of Islington vestrymen under the Metropolis Management Act 1855.

1918–1950 

Under the next redistribution of seats by the Representation of the People Act 1918 constituencies in the County of London were defined in terms of wards of the metropolitan boroughs created in 1900. Islington North comprised three wards of the Metropolitan Borough of Islington: Tollington, Tufnell and Upper Holloway.

1950–1974 
 At the next redistribution of seats by the Representation of the People Act 1948 the constituency was again defined as Tollington, Tufnell and Upper Holloway wards of the Metropolitan Borough of Islington, with boundaries as they existed at the end of 1947.

1974–1983 
In 1965 local government in Greater London was reorganised, with the formation of London boroughs. The changes were reflected in parliamentary boundaries from 1974. The London Borough of Islington was divided into three constituencies. Islington North was defined as comprising seven wards: Highview, Hillmarton, Hillrise, Junction, Parkway, St. George's and Station.

1983–1997 
In 1983 the parliamentary representation of Islington was reduced to two constituencies. The new, enlarged, Islington North was formed from ten wards of the borough as they existed in February 1983. These were Gillespie, Highbury, Highview, Hillrise, Junction, Mildmay, Quadrant, St. George's, Sussex and Tollington wards.

1997–2010 
In 1997 there were only slight boundary changes, with the constituency defined as the same ten wards with their boundaries as they existed on 1 June 1994.

Since 2010 

The seat, which is the smallest constituency in the UK by area, covers the northern half of the London Borough of Islington, which includes the areas of Holloway, Highbury, Tufnell Park, Upper Holloway and Archway.

The constituency now comprises eight electoral wards: Finsbury Park, Highbury East, Highbury West, Hillrise, Junction, Mildmay, St. George's and Tollington.

These boundaries have been considerably changed since 1970, when Islington returned three MPs and shared another with Hackney. This reflects the depopulation of central London on a lowering of adult occupancy of households and the local authority has replaced tower blocks. The core of the constituency was the area north of Seven Sisters Road and Camden Road.  At , it is the smallest UK Parliamentary constituency.  At the Fifth Periodic Review of Westminster constituencies begun in 2012 the seat was approximately 1,300 electors below the electoral quota and the highest concentration of elector density nationally.  The criteria of successive reviews emphasise equal electorates as well as restricting seats to one or, if unavoidable, two local authority areas.

Members of Parliament

Election results

Elections in the 2010s 

:

Elections in the 2000s

Elections in the 1990s

Elections in the 1980s

Elections in the 1970s

Elections in the 1960s

Elections in the 1950s

Elections in the 1940s

Elections in the 1930s

Elections in the 1920s

Elections in the 1910s 

* Craig lists Arnall as an Independent Labour candidate.

Elections in the 1900s

Elections in the 1890s

Elections in the 1880s

Further information 
A short film was made about the 1969 by-election.  This highlighted the importance of the local Irish community, the poor local housing conditions (the opening line talks of "a crowded, crumbling constituency") and the relatively low turn-outs at previous elections.  The film is now available through British Pathé Archive.

Michael O'Halloran, elected Labour MP for Islington North in 1969, was the subject of an investigation in the early-1970s by The Sunday Times newspaper. They highlighted his background with a local building company and the local Irish community and queried the tactics of his supporters during his selection as candidate.

O'Halloran defected to the SDP in September 1981, as did both of the other Islington MPs. However the Boundary Commission cut the number of constituencies in Islington from three to two. O'Halloran sought selection as the SDP candidate for the revised Islington North constituency but the local SDP association selected John Grant, then-SDP (elected as Labour) MP for Islington Central, as their official candidate. In February 1983, O'Halloran resigned his membership of the SDP and sat in Parliament as an "Independent Labour" member, supporting the Parliamentary Labour Party. Despite this, he failed to regain the Labour Party nomination for the 1983 general election and he was defeated by the new Labour candidate, Jeremy Corbyn, and finished in fourth place with 11.1% of the vote.

Corbyn defeated Paul Boateng for the Labour Party selection. Boateng subsequently became the first Black Cabinet Minister in the UK.

See also 
 List of parliamentary constituencies in London
 List of parliamentary constituencies in Islington

References

External links 
Politics Resources (election results from 1922 onwards)
Electoral Calculus (election results from 1955 onwards)

Bibliography 
 
 
 
 
 

Parliamentary constituencies in London
Constituencies of the Parliament of the United Kingdom established in 1885
Politics of the London Borough of Islington
Jeremy Corbyn